American rock band Aerosmith has released 15 studio albums, six live albums, 16 compilation albums, and two extended plays. Aerosmith was formed in Boston, Massachusetts in 1970 by vocalist Steven Tyler, guitarists Joe Perry and Ray Tabano, bassist Tom Hamilton, and drummer Joey Kramer. Tabano was replaced by Brad Whitford in 1971. Other than a period from 1979 to 1984, this lineup has remained the same.

Aerosmith is estimated to have sold well over 150 million albums around the world, making them the biggest-selling hard rock band in United States history. As of November 2021, the band has sold 69.5 million albums in the United States in terms of certification units, and 31,702,000 albums since 1991 when SoundScan started tracking actual sales figures.

Albums

Studio albums

Live albums

Compilation albums

Extended plays
 Vacation Club (December 10, 1988)
 Made in America (March 18, 1997)

Other appearances

See also
Aerosmith singles discography
Aerosmith videography
List of songs recorded by Aerosmith
List of awards and nominations received by Aerosmith
List of best-selling albums in the United States
List of best-selling music artists
List of best-selling music artists in the United States
Joe Perry discography
Steven Tyler discography
Whitford/St. Holmes

References

External links

Rock music group discographies
Discographies of American artists
Discography